Undule Mwakasungula is a 'retired' human rights activist in Malawi. As an activist, he served as the chairperson for the Human Rights Consultative Committee (HRCC). He is also the former director for the Centre for Human Rights and Rehabilitation (HCRR), a network of Church Institutions, Human Rights NGOs and the Law Society of Malawi that serves to work together in areas of human rights, advocacy and information sharing. HRCC and Mwakasungula was one of the primary organizers of the July 20th, 2011 Malawian protests.  He has been a critical opponent of the Bingu wa Mutharika administration, likening it to Robert Mugabe's Administration of Zimbabwe, "We are almost Zimbabwe, both in the economy and in political governance."

Malawi Protests
Mwakasungula has mentioned that he was arrested and detained in Lilongwe on the day of the protests and later released. He went into hiding briefly after the July 20, 2011 protests in Malawi. He has been acting as a spokesperson for the protest leaders and announced the postponement of the August 17th protests.

Gay Rights Activism
He has come under criticism by anti-gay civil society groups in Malawi due to his defense of gay and lesbians in Malawi and being outspoken against the criminalization of homosexuality.

Malawian human rights activists
Malawian activists
Living people
Year of birth missing (living people)